Howard Kent Walker (born December 3, 1935) is a US diplomat, Foreign Service officer, and former United States Ambassador to Togo, Madagascar, and Comoros.

Early life and education 
Walker was born on December 3, 1935, in Newport News, Virginia. He graduated from the University of Michigan with an A.B. in 1957 and M.A. in 1958. He enrolled in the United States Air Force as first lieutenant from 1962 to 65. He graduated from Boston University with a Ph.D. in 1968. He is married, has two children, and currently resides in Atlantic City, New Jersey.

Political career 
Walker joined the U.S. Department of State and was assigned as a research analyst from 1965 to 1968 and international relations officer of the Office of Inter-African Affairs and principal officer in Kaduna, from 1971 to 1973. From 1973 to 1975 he was in the Department as international relations officer of the Office of West African Affairs. He was counselor for political affairs in Amman, Jordan from 1975 to 1977, Deputy Chief of Mission in Dar es Salaam, Tanzania, from 1977 to 1979, and in 1979, Deputy Chief of Mission in Pretoria, South Africa. In 1982 he became the United States Ambassador to Togo, replacing Marilyn P. Johnson. He left in 1984.

References

Living people
Ambassadors of the United States to Togo
Ambassadors of the United States to the Comoros
Ambassadors of the United States to Madagascar
1935 births
University of Michigan alumni
United States Foreign Service personnel
20th-century American diplomats